The Truth About Killer Dinosaurs is a two-part BBC documentary film, directed by Bill Oddie, in which a group of men test out dinosaur weapons, using studies. The first episode determines the winner of a battle between Tyrannosaurus and Triceratops, and the second compares the strength of an Ankylosaurus and Velociraptor. The episodes were broadcast on BBC 1 in August and September 2004. In the U.S., The Truth About killer Dinosaurs was also known as Dinosaur Face-Off.

Episodes and animals
These are the episodes and the evidence revealed in them.

1 Tyrannosaurus  vs. Triceratops
Original air date: September 28, 2004

Tyrannosaurus 
Evidence of head injuries on Triceratops indicates that Tyrannosaurus rex attacked     Triceratops.
Using a steel Tyrannosaurus rex  skull, scientists learned that Tyrannosaurus could easily crush a small mini cooper.  
Scientists learn that Tyrannosaurus could run at 3  miles per day.    
Scanning an endo cast from a        Tyrannosaurus rex   skull, scientists theorize that Tyrannosaurus rex   had a brain similar to that of a modern-day alligator.
Tyrannosaurus had nice vision, and a big sense of smell.
Tyrannosaurus could bite through bone, at a bite force of at least four tons per square inch.

Triceratops 
Doing a crash test with a   Triceratops skull, made of solid resin, scientists learn that contrary to portrayals in the media, Triceratops probably did not charge at predators nor other dinosaurs, for its skull would likely break.
Triceratops may have gored its predators.
Triceratops was slower than  Tyrannosaurus, but was more agile.

Face Off 
An even match. In the episode, it is shown that if the  rex   makes an attack, it might attack the Triceratops, but if the plant eater discovers a  booby trap, he could beat his opponent and kill it.

The T. rex is seen stalking the Triceratops. It suddenly runs out of the bush and being fast, it takes the Triceratops.        The  rex bites into the Triceratops neck, knocks it down and eats it alive.

The T. rex is wandering through the forest looking for a tasty meal.       It soon comes across two male  Triceratops battling.      while   the two are done battling, the      Tyrannosaurus singles one of them as a target.        After picking its victim, the     T-rex charges, but the    Triceratops  finds it just in time and turns away to face the hungry killer.    The T-rex seizes the horn of the Triceratops and breaks it off. The herbivore tries to retreat again, but the T-rex chomps on its frill.      After making a loud charge, the Triceratops slashes one of its horns into the    T-rex's    belly.       The    T-rex  limps away, falls to the ground and slowly dies.      The Triceratops  then watches its attacker die and goes away to finish another day of eating.

2 Velociraptor vs. Ankylosaurus 
Original air date: September 4, 2004
 Velociraptor 
Velociraptor was only the size of a turkey.
Velociraptor had feathers.
A robotic Velociraptor leg provides evidence that Velociraptor did not cut its meal.    
The fossil of a Velociraptor fighting a Protoceratops shows that the Velociraptor pierced the neck of its prey, possibly to impale the arteries or the vein.
Velociraptor'''s wings were used for balance and agility, much like the wings of an African ostrich.
Along with its claws, Velociraptors teeth were useful weapons.Velociraptor most likely hunted in small packs.
Teeth of this dinosaur were found among its next meals.   
The claw provides evidence that the Velociraptor could not penetrate the ankylosaurus   's armor, it broke when tested on a croc's skin.

Ankylosaurus 
Ankylosaurus armor was similar to a crocodile's, though significantly harder.
Young crocs have no armor, especially on the neck.          Baby ankylosaurus were probably similar.
A robotic ankylosaurus tail shows that the tail club could break wood and bone with ease.
This dinosaur's armour and club was used only on more threatening predators than Velociraptor.
In the U.S version, it was known as Ankylosaurus, although Ankylosaurus itself lived in North America. The ankylosaurus in this fact have been      Pinacosaurus.

 Face Off 
The ankylosaurus would win, although Velociraptors  could easily kill young ankylosauruses, which have armor.

The ankylosaurus is being attacked by three   Velociraptors.             They try to attack it four times but its armor proves thick.       The ankylosaurus is able to drive them away by swinging its tail club (one hit would have killed one of the pack).

The ankylosaurus is grazing and her young dollies come very close to her to avoid some danger, but one of them runs off to an unsafe playground.        Two Velociraptors lay a trap around the female dolly, one of them bursts out of cover to stampede the dolly and the dolly escapes the Velociraptor, only to be driven into the claws of another one.     The two Velociraptors attack the dolly, slashing her with their claws. The dolly tries desperately to save herself with her tail club, but is quickly overwhelmed.      One of the   raptors drives a claw into the dolly's neck, killing her.    The     Velociraptors then have the female baby as their payback.

 Minor appearances 

 Tarbosaurus 
 The Tarbosaurus appears in the second episode heart of death.            It fights the ankylosaurus and loses it (the tail club breaks its leg).

 Protoceratops 
 The Protoceratops appears in the second part heart of death in two fights against a   Velociraptor. The first is a re-enactment of the fighting dinosaurs scene, while the second pits it against two Velociraptors, where the latter wins.

 See also 
 Jurassic Fight Club''

References

External links 
 
 

BBC television documentaries
Discovery Channel original programming
Documentary television series about dinosaurs
2004 British television series debuts
2004 British television series endings
English-language television shows